"Already Gone" is a song from Powderfinger's third studio album Internationalist. It was released as a single on 12 February 1999.

Australian Idol's first season runner-up Shannon Noll performed "Already Gone" in the 22 September episode of Australian Idol 2003 as his contribution to the Australian Hits category.

Music video
The music video for "Already Gone" was a change in direction for Powderfinger, and one that caused a certain degree of backlash from their fans. Fanning himself has publicly disowned the music clip, meanwhile still embracing the song attached to it. Fanning put this down to "being lazy" and has commented that he never meant to misinterpret women in such a way. The music video has some women scantily clad playing Totem tennis in a suggestible manner.

Track listing

 "Already Gone"
 "Control Freak"
 "Today You Come"
 "The Day You Come (Remix)"
 "Tom (Demo)"

Charts

References

Powderfinger songs
1999 singles
1998 songs
Universal Records singles
Songs written by Jon Coghill
Songs written by John Collins (Australian musician)
Songs written by Bernard Fanning
Songs written by Ian Haug
Songs written by Darren Middleton